Niazabad (also Romanized as Nīāzābād and Neyāzābād; also known as Nīāz) is a village in Doab Rural District, in the Central District of Selseleh County, Lorestan Province, Iran. At the 2006 census, its population was 128, in 29 families.

References 

Towns and villages in Selseleh County